The 2017–18 Kansas State Wildcats women's basketball team represented Kansas State University in the 2017–18 NCAA Division I women's basketball season. The Wildcats were led by fourth-year head coach Jeff Mittie, and played their home games at Bramlage Coliseum in Manhattan, Kansas as members of the Big 12 Conference. They finished the season 18–16, 7–11 in Big 12 play to finish in a tie for seventh place. They advanced to the quarterfinals of the Big 12 women's tournament where they lost to Baylor. They received an at-large bid to the Women's National Invitation Tournament where they defeated Saint Louis and Utah in the first and second rounds before losing to UC Davis in the third round.

Previous season
They finished the season 23–11, 11–7 in Big 12 play to finish in fourth place. They advanced to the semifinals of the Big 12 women's tournament where they lost to Baylor. They received an at-large bid to the NCAA women's tournament where they defeated Drake in the first round before losing to Stanford in the second round.

Roster

Schedule and results 

|-
!colspan=9 style=""| Exhibition

|-
!colspan=9 style=""| Non-conference regular season

|-
!colspan=9 style=""| Big 12 regular season

|-
!colspan=9 style=""| Big 12 Women's Tournament

|-
!colspan=9 style=""| WNIT

Rankings
2017–18 NCAA Division I women's basketball rankings

See also 
 2017–18 Kansas State Wildcats men's basketball team

References

External links
 Official Team Website

Kansas State Wildcats women's basketball seasons
Kansas State
Kansas State